Oruç Reis is the name of a number of Turkish vessels. It may refer to:

, a research vessel
, a former submarine of the Turkish Navy (ex-)
, Barbaros-class frigate of the Turkish Navy
, decommissioned Oruç Reis-class submarine of the Turkish Navy (ex-)

Ship names